Eugoa palawanica is a moth of the family Erebidae. It is found in the Philippines (Palawan).

References

 Natural History Museum Lepidoptera generic names catalog

palawanica
Moths described in 2008